Vlastimil Ouředník (born February 10, 1951 in České Budějovice) is a Czechoslovak retired slalom canoeist who competed in the early-to-mid 1970s. He finished 20th in the K-1 event at the 1972 Summer Olympics in Munich.

References
Sports-reference.com profile

1951 births
Canoeists at the 1972 Summer Olympics
Czechoslovak male canoeists
Living people
Olympic canoeists of Czechoslovakia
Sportspeople from České Budějovice